Stan Wright may refer to:

 Stan Wright (rugby union) (born 1978), Cook Islands international rugby union player
 Stan Wright (track coach) (1921-1998), first black head coach of a United States track and field team
 Stan Wright (Australian rules footballer) (born 1918), Australian rules footballer